Peterculter , also known as Culter (Scots: Couter), is a suburb of Aberdeen, Scotland, about  inland from Aberdeen city centre.  Peterculter is on the northern banks of the River Dee, near the confluences with Crynoch Burn and Leuchar Burn. Following the 1996 Scottish council boundary changes it became part of the City of Aberdeen's Lower Deeside ward.

The latter part of the name is said to come from the Gaelic compound word "Cul-tir", which signifies the "back part" of the country.

History

King William the Lion bestowed the church of Kulter, "iuxta Abirdene", upon the Abbey and monks of St Mary of Kelso, about 1165–1199. The gift was afterwards confirmed by Mathew, Bishop of Aberdeen, within whose diocese the church sat.

Alan of Soltre, chaplain, who had probably been an ecclesiastic of the hospital, or monastery of Soutra, in Lothian, was presented by the Abbot of Kelso, to the vicarage of the church of Culter, 1239–1240.

In 1287–1288, an agreement was made between the Abbot and Convent of Kelso and the brotherhood of the Knights of Jerusalem, regarding the Templars’ lands of Blairs and Kincolsi (Kincousie, now Kincaussie), on the south side of the Dee, by which a chapel, built by the Templars at their house of Culter, was recognised as a church, with parochial rights, for the inhabitants of the said lands. It was this agreement that changed the existing parish of Culter into two separate parishes with two separate names, the other being Maryculter.

Attractions
 
High up on the steep, rocky bank of the Culter Burn near the western exit of the town was a colourful and well-tended kilted wooden figure holding a broadsword and targe (shield) that represents Rob Roy Macgregor, who according to local legend leapt across the burn at that point to flee pursuing Hanoverian troops (Given the width of the stream there, the story - which has its local variants in many parts of Scotland - is unlikely to have much basis in fact). The outlaw Gilderoy is a more likely historical figure for the story. The original statue is thought to have been a modified ship's figurehead. The statue was replaced in 2017 by a resin effigy, wearing ancient Macgregor tartan.

In the town itself there are chances of many local walks, including its connection to the Deeside Way at the site of the former Culter railway station, as well as the forest area known locally as 'Sandy Hilly', or 'The Muggie Widds' (St. Margaret Woods), the entrance to which sits beside the Bucklerburn region.

For sport, there is Peterculter Golf Club and Culter Sports Centre.  Each year, on the last Saturday in May is the Culter Gala, in the main playing field of the town; this event draws hundreds of local townsfolk.

Education
Culter School is a primary school in Peterculter dating from 1896.

Notable people
 Alexander Cuming, explorer.
 William Duff, minister and psychologist
 Oswald Lumsden, cricketer
 William Lumsden, cricketer
 John Mortimer, cricketer
 Nan Shepherd, writer, whose portrait currently appears on a Scottish £5 note.
 Peter Donald Thomson, moderator of the Church of Scotland.

See also
Crathes Castle
Drum Castle
Maryculter House
Muchalls Castle

Notes

External links
 CulterNET community website
 Peterculter Parish Church
 Peterculter Golf Club

Areas of Aberdeen
Villages in Aberdeen